Tic Tac Toc: El reencuentro is a Mexican comedy television series that premiered on Las Estrellas on 12 April 2021. The series is produced by Reynaldo López. It stars Pierre Angelo, Reynaldo Rossano, Carlos Espejel, Mariana Ochoa, Lisset, Alejandro Suárez, and Héctor Sandarti. The series revolves around a popular musical group from the 1980s that seek to repeat their success 35 years later. Production of the series began on 17 March 2021.

Plot 
Tic Tac Toc was a children's music group that was famous and successful in the 1980s and, 35 years later, decide to organize a reunion. Natalia, Pierre, Reynaldo and Carlos at first join forces to raise funds to support one of their members who is in need of a surgical procedure. However, each member has their dark secrets and quiet goals that they intend to achieve through this reunion. Together they will try to regain the brilliance and success they had 35 years ago, while the fraudulent businessman Tito Gambino will try to exploit them for his own gain.

Cast 
 Pierre Angelo as Pierre
 Reynaldo Rossano as Reynaldo
 Carlos Espejel as Carlos
 Mariana Ochoa as Taís
 Lisset as Natalia
 Alejandro Suárez as Tito Gambino
 Héctor Sandarti as Gerardo

Episodes

References 

2020s Mexican television series
2021 Mexican television series debuts
2021 Mexican television series endings
Las Estrellas original programming
Mexican television sitcoms
Television series by Televisa
Spanish-language television shows